The life and work of the Colombian singer Shakira has generated various books that recount her life, experience and achievements. This is a list containing the different works written about Shakira, including biographies, magazines, and articles.

According to various journalists from the 1990s, the appearance of the singer Shakira was an event in the Latin market, her albums "Pies Descalzos" and "¿Donde Está los Ladrones?" They are considered by magazines such as Rolling Stone as essential for the Latin industry in its Latin pop and Latin rock fields, helping to open the doors for new women within these fields mostly dominated by men.

Many authors have written more than one book about Shakira from her biography to her cultural impact and these have been published in various languages ​​such as English, Spanish and others. Published biographies on the singer include: "Shakira, Woman Full of Grace", "Shakira", "Real Life Reader Biography, Shakira", "Shakira, Star Singer". Several being released only in Latin markets while others are released in English for the international market. At the present time, Shakira is used as an example of overcoming a Latino to succeed in the world without losing the culture that characterizes her or her identity, citing her success since the first album, having success in Europe and how it has somehow managed to catapult the Latin music to the international market, bringing music in Spanish to various countries outside of Latin culture.  She has been the subject of more than one scholarly articles as well.

Books written

2000 - Present

References 

Shakira
Bibliographies of people
Music bibliographies